In linguistics, a future tense is a verb form that marks the event described by a verb as not having happened yet, but expected to in the future.

Future tense may also refer to:

 Future: Tense: The Coming World Order, a 2004 book by Canadian journalist and author Gwynne Dyer
 Future Tense, a science fiction anthology edited by Kendell Foster Crossen
 "Future Tense", episode from the animated TV series Gargoyles
 "Future Tense" (Star Trek: Enterprise), television series episode
 Future Tense (album), a 2008 album by Apologetix
 Future Tense (American radio show), hosted by John Moe
 Future Tense (Irish radio show), hosted by Ella McSweeney
 "Future Tense", a song by the Matches from their 2008 album A Band in Hope

See also
 Past Tense (disambiguation)
 Present Tense (disambiguation)